Scott Cummings may refer to:
 Scott Cummings (footballer), Australian rules footballer
 Scott Cummings (rugby union), Scottish rugby union player
 Scott Cummings (darts player), Canadian darts player